The 2019 Race of Champions was the 30th running of the Race of Champions, and took place on 19–20 January 2019 at Foro Sol inside the Autódromo Hermanos Rodríguez in Mexico. The competition saw local rally driver, Benito Guerra Jr. take the top spot in the individual category beating Loïc Duval in the final.

The Stadium Super Trucks held their 2018 season finale at the event, racing as a standalone series and fielding trucks for ROC competitors. Like ROC, SST used a head-to-head knockout system in which two drivers competed against each other, with the winner advancing to the next round; should a driver lose in the first two rounds, they may proceed if they were the fastest of the defeated drivers as the "Fastest Loser". After three rounds, the final two drivers competed in the final round. Robby Gordon and Matthew Brabham won the weekend's two SST races, the latter also clinching the championship.

Participants

Winners

Stadium Super Trucks results

References

2019
2019 in motorsport
Auto races in Mexico
2019 in Mexican motorsport
January 2019 sports events in Mexico
International sports competitions hosted by Mexico